Legends of Oz: Dorothy's Return is a 2013 computer-animated musical fantasy film that is loosely based on the 1989 book Dorothy of Oz by L. Frank Baum's great-grandson Roger Stanton Baum. It was directed by Daniel St. Pierre and Will Finn. The film stars the voices of Lea Michele, Dan Aykroyd, Jim Belushi, Kelsey Grammer, Hugh Dancy, Megan Hilty, Oliver Platt, Patrick Stewart, Bernadette Peters, and Martin Short.

The film premiered at the Annecy International Animated Film Festival in France on June 14, 2013 and was released in the United States and Canada on May 9, 2014. It was panned by critics and became a box-office bomb, grossing $21.7 million worldwide against a budget of $70 million, often considered to be the one of the worst films ever made. It is also the only film produced by Summertime Entertainment, which shut down in response to the film's underperformance at the box office. Due to the film's poor reception, Clarius Entertainment cancelled the planned sequels and a TV series.

Plot
In the Land of Oz, the Emerald City's co-leaders – the Scarecrow, Tin Woodman, and the Cowardly Lion – discover that an evil Jester has stolen the broomstick of his sister, the late Wicked Witch of the West, and taken control over the Flying Monkeys. With Oz's future at stake, the Scarecrow decides to use his invention called the Rainbow Mover to summon Dorothy Gale to save the kingdom again. However, flying monkeys invade the castle and force the trio out the window.

In Kansas, Dorothy's farm has been wrecked by a tornado, leaving it in disrepair. A sleazy man claiming to be a government appraiser arrives and condemns the farmhouse, handing the Gales an eviction notice. Dorothy discovers people all across town have been handed the same notices and are moving on. Dorothy and Toto encounter a rainbow which transports them to Oz, but not to the Emerald City as intended.

Dorothy meets Wiser, an overweight but intelligent owl who cannot fly. They enter Candy Country, where everything is made out of confectionery, including the people. They are promptly arrested by Marshal Mallow for breaking the "no eating anything made of candy" rule due to the Jester tampering with the signs, and are taken to court. Upon realizing who Dorothy is, the judge drops the charges and releases her and Wiser. Mallow joins the group on their way to the Emerald City as a promise he made to find the missing General Candy Apple. Meanwhile, Glinda confronts the Jester, who has used a magic scepter created from his sister's broomstick and crystal ball to turn Oz's leaders, including General Candy Apple, into subservient marionettes. Glinda falls victim to this as well, giving him complete control of Oz.

Dorothy's company enter the Dainty China Country and require permission from the vain China Princess to pass through her kingdom. With Mallow posing as a suitor, the group enter the China Princess' castle and see her rejecting potential suitors, but she is enchanted by Mallow's singing. An earthquake caused by the Jester damages the land. An angry China Princess blames Dorothy for the Jester's torment, but agrees to allow her group to pass through on the condition that she accompanies them. Finding a bridge to the Emerald City destroyed, the group decide to construct a boat. All the talking trees refuse to cooperate except for an aging tree named Tugg, who is carved into a galleon. They sail into the Emerald City, finding it abandoned, only to be attacked by the Flying Monkeys. Dorothy's group escapes into a cave system but tumbles down a waterfall.

The China Princess is shattered by the fall and presumed dead, prompting Dorothy to head for the Jester's palace alone. Mallow mourns for the princess before discovering she is alive and fixing her. Mustering his confidence and strength, Wiser manages to fly off to aid Dorothy. Dorothy and Toto confront the Jester, who plans to kill her, only for Toto to drop a curtain on his head, with the lead Flying Monkey named "You" stealing the Jester's staff to regrow its wings after the latter shrunk them. As the Jester gives chase, Dorothy reunites with her captured friends, and they confront the Jester on the rooftop. Dorothy falls off the roof in the ensuing fight for the staff, but is caught by Wiser.

The rest of Dorothy's friends arrive with Tugg built on wheels, engaging the Flying Monkeys in battle. The Jester tries to rid himself of Dorothy by summoning a tornado, but Dorothy's own magic breaks the spell damaging Oz, freeing its leaders. The Jester is nearly sucked into the tornado, but is saved by Dorothy. However, once she casts the staff into the tornado, the Jester jumps in after it and vanishes along with it. Glinda appears and sends Dorothy and Toto home.

Reuniting with Aunt Em and Uncle Henry, Dorothy rallies the townsfolk to stand up for their homes, discovering the appraiser is a con artist using multiple fake licenses to commit crimes. He is arrested by the sheriff while his lackey runs off, and Dorothy and her town's homes are rebuilt.

Cast 
 Lea Michele as Dorothy Gale
 Dan Aykroyd as Scarecrow
 Jim Belushi as Lion
 Kelsey Grammer as Tin Man
 Martin Short as Jester, Appraiser
 Hugh Dancy as Marshal Mallow
 Megan Hilty as China Princess, Mouse Queen
 Oliver Platt as Wiser
 Patrick Stewart as Tugg/Tank
 Bernadette Peters as Glinda
 Tacey Adams as Aunt Em
 Michael Krawic as Uncle Henry
 Randi Soyland as You the Flying Monkey, China Handmaiden
 Brian Blessed as Judge Jawbreaker
 Douglas Hodge as Fruit Stripe Lawyer
 Debi Derryberry as Lollipop Stenographer
 Randy Crenshaw as China Guard, Kansas Sheriff
 Randal Keith as First Minister, Winkie Suitor
 Richard Horvitz as Munchkin Suitor
 Tom Kenny as China Suitor

Flying Monkey vocal effects provided by Scott Menville, Alan Shearman, Randi Soyland, and Flip Waterman.

Production
When the Carroll brothers began raising money for the film in 2006, they were running a company called Alpine Pictures, which had previously made several low budget films. The Carrols had a history of fundraising activities dating back to at least 1993, when they were sent a cease-and-desist letter by the state of Oregon accusing of them of selling unregistered securities. The next decade they received cease-and-desist orders and fines in states such as California, Wisconsin, Utah, Michigan, and Illinois. On the December 2, 2013 edition of the SpaceCast podcast, executive producer Greg Centineo confirmed that the film would be a musical and would feature music composed by Bryan Adams who in addition also had a small voice role as a beaver foreman.

According to an investigation by TheWrap, a total of six states in the United States individually sent cease-and-desist letters to the Carroll brothers as they were fundraising for the film, accusing them of violating financial laws. It was reported by TheWrap that potential investors for the film had been told that the film would gross anywhere from $720 million to $2.04 billion U.S. dollars.

Music

The Legends of Oz, Dorothy Returns: Original Motion Picture Soundtrack was released on May 6, 2014 by Columbia Records, a division of Sony Music Entertainment.

Original songs performed for the film include:

Reception
Legends of Oz: Dorothy's Return was panned by both critics and audiences and is considered to be the worst animated films and among the worst films ever made. On the review aggregator website Rotten Tomatoes, the film received a score of 16% based on 62 critics, with the consensus statement being: "Faced with the choice between staying in or seeing Legends of Oz: Dorothy's Return, most filmgoers will be forced to conclude that there's no place like home."  At Metacritic, which assigns a weighted average score out of 100 to reviews from mainstream critics, the film received an average score of 25 based on 22 reviews, indicating "generally unfavorable reviews". CinemaScore gave the film an "A" on an A+ to F scale, based on polls conducted during the opening weekend.

Box office
The film made $1 million on its opening day in the United States, and $3.7 million in its first weekend, against an estimated $70 million budget. By the end of its run, the film grossed $8.5 million in North America and $13.2 million internationally for a worldwide total of $21.7 million.

Accolades
At the 35th Golden Raspberry Awards, Kelsey Grammer won the award for Worst Supporting Actor for voicing the Tin Man in the film as well as for his live-action roles in The Expendables 3, Think Like a Man Too and Transformers: Age of Extinction. This is the second animated film to win a Razzie; previously, Thumbelina won the since-retired award for Worst Original Song in 1995 for "Marry the Mole".

The film also received a nomination with Daniel St. Pierre for Best Feature Cristal Award at the Annecy International Animated Film Festival.

Home media
Legends of Oz: Dorothy's Return was released on DVD and Blu-ray by 20th Century Fox Home Entertainment on August 26, 2014.

Cancelled franchise
Despite the film's underperformance at the box office, two sequels and a TV series were said to be in the works (though the plan was that the sequels would likely go directly to DVD if the film did not perform well at the box office). But no news has been announced, and the websites for the Legends of Oz franchise and for Summertime Entertainment are inactive and have been taken down; the only active web media is the Facebook page of Summertime Entertainment, which has not seen any new posts since promotion for the film's home media release in September 2014.

See also
 List of films considered the worst

References

External links
 
 
 
 

2013 films
2013 3D films
2013 computer-animated films
2010s American animated films
2010s Canadian animated films
2010s fantasy adventure films
2010s musical fantasy films
American children's animated adventure films
American children's animated fantasy films
American children's animated musical films
American fantasy adventure films
American musical fantasy films
Golden Raspberry Award winning films
Animated films based on The Wizard of Oz
Animated films based on children's books
Films based on American novels
Films directed by Will Finn
Films scored by Toby Chu
3D animated films
2010s English-language films
2010s Canadian films